Neodrypta costigera is a species of beetle in the family Carabidae, the only species in the genus Neodrypta.

References

Dryptinae